Mount's Bay or Mounts Bay may refer to:

Mount's Bay, Cornwall UK
Mounts Bay RFC, a defunct rugby club formerly based in Penzance
Mounts Bay Road, Perth, Western Australia
Mounts Bay, in the Swan River Estuary, Perth, see Swan River (Western Australia)
HMS Mounts Bay (K627), a Royal Navy ship
RFA Mounts Bay (L3008), a Royal Fleet auxiliary ship